James Bond was a comic strip that was based on the eponymous, fictional character created by author Ian Fleming. Starting in 1958 and continuing to 1983, it consisted of 52 story arcs that were syndicated in British newspapers, seven of which were initially published abroad.

Publication history

Daily Express strips

In 1957, the Daily Express, a newspaper owned by Lord Beaverbrook, approached Ian Fleming about adapting his James Bond stories as comic strips. Fleming was then reluctant, because he felt the comic strips would lack the quality of his writing, potentially hurting his spy novel series while he was still writing. Fleming wrote:

Art by John McLusky

Regardless, Fleming later agreed, and to aid the Daily Express in illustrating James Bond, Fleming commissioned an artist to sketch whom he believed James Bond to look like. The assigned illustrator, John McLusky, however, felt that Fleming's 007 appeared too "outdated" and "pre-war", and thus changed James Bond to a more rugged and masculine appearance.

The first strip, Casino Royale, was published in 1958. The story was adapted by Anthony Hern, who previously had serialised Diamonds Are Forever and From Russia with Love for the Daily Express. The majority of the early comic strips were adapted by Henry Gammidge (other than the Dr. No adaptation, 1960, by Peter O'Donnell, years before he launched his strip Modesty Blaise). McLusky later would illustrate twelve more James Bond comic strips with partner Gammidge until 1966.

In 1962 the Daily Express abruptly cancelled their agreement with Ian Fleming when Lord Beaverbrook and Fleming disputed the rights to the James Bond short story "The Living Daylights". Fleming had sold the rights to the Sunday Times, a rival newspaper — upsetting Beaverbrook into terminating his business relationship with Fleming. The dispute abruptly ended the comic strip adaptation of Thunderball. Additional panels were added later for its syndication to other newspapers, and to expand and conclude the story. Beaverbrook and Fleming later settled their differences, and the comic strip serial would continue in 1964 with On Her Majesty's Secret Service.

Art by Yaroslav Horak

In 1966 Yaroslav Horak replaced John McLusky as the artist for the Daily Express comic strip series and adapted six more Ian Fleming James Bond novels and short stories as well as Kingsley Amis' Colonel Sun with partner Jim Lawrence. The Living Daylights was also republished in the Daily Express after first appearing in the first edition of the Sunday Times magazine on 4 February 1962 and in the American magazine Argosy in June of the same year under the title Berlin Escape.

With the success of The Man with the Golden Gun Horak and Lawrence subsequently went on to write and illustrate twenty original James Bond comic strips for the Daily Express after being granted permission by Ian Fleming's Trust.

Other James Bond comic strips
In 1977 the Daily Express discontinued their series of Bond comic strips, although Horak and Lawrence went on to write and illustrate several other James Bond adventures for syndication abroad in Europe, for the Sunday Express (the Sunday edition of the Daily Express), and the Daily Star. Additionally, John McLusky returned to team up with Jim Lawrence for five comic strips. One strip, Doomcrack, featured artwork by Harry North, who at the time worked for MAD Magazine on its film parodies.

The 1983 strip Polestar was abruptly terminated by the Daily Star midway through its run and was not completed, although the complete story did appear in non-UK newspapers and was followed by several more complete serials before the James Bond comic strip officially came to an end.

Titan Books reprints
Since first publication in the Daily Express, the comic strip adaptations have been reprinted several times. First by the James Bond 007 International Fan Club, in the early 1980s. Then annually, from 1987 to 1990, by the British Titan Books company in anthologies, beginning with The Living Daylights to tie-in with the release of the eponymous James Bond film.

First Titan Books series
The Living Daylights (June 1987) — includes: The Man with the Golden Gun and The Living Daylights
Octopussy (March 1988) — includes: Octopussy and The Hildebrand Rarity
The Spy Who Loved Me (June 1989) — includes: The Spy Who Loved Me
Casino Royale (July 1990) — includes Casino Royale and Live and Let Die

Second Titan Books series
Beginning in 2004, Titan reissued these anthologies in larger, revised editions, and also began reprinting stories that hadn't been featured in the earlier books. With a more frequent publishing schedule than the first series, all 52 stories had been published in seventeen books by March 2010. These volumes include new introductory chapters on the history of the strip and the Bond novels, and most of the books have also included special introductions written by Bond film actors, specifically Caroline Munro (The Spy Who Loved Me), George Lazenby (OHMSS), Shirley Eaton (Goldfinger), Eunice Gayson (Dr. No), Roger Moore (Casino Royale), Maud Adams (Octopussy), Britt Ekland (Colonel Sun), and Richard Kiel (The Golden Ghost). Titan's comic strip reprints were not initially published in the strips' original publication order; this changed as of the release of The Spy Who Loved Me volume.

The Man with the Golden Gun (February 2004) — The Man with the Golden Gun and The Living Daylights
Octopussy (May 2004) — Octopussy and The Hildebrand Rarity
On Her Majesty's Secret Service (August 2004) — On Her Majesty's Secret Service and You Only Live Twice
Goldfinger (November 2004) — Goldfinger, Risico, From a View to a Kill, For Your Eyes Only and Thunderball
Casino Royale (February 2005) — Casino Royale, Live and Let Die and Moonraker
Dr. No (May 2005) — Diamonds Are Forever, From Russia with Love and Dr. No
The Spy Who Loved Me (August 2005) — The Spy Who Loved Me and The Harpies
Colonel Sun (December 2005) — River of Death and Colonel Sun
The Golden Ghost (April 2006) — The Golden Ghost, Fear Face, Double Jeopardy and Starfire
Trouble Spot (September 2006) — Trouble Spot, Isle Of Condors, The League Of Vampires and Die With My Boots On
The Phoenix Project (February 2007) — The Phoenix Project, The Black Ruby Caper, Till Death Do Us Part and The Torch-Time Affair
Death Wing (July 2007) — Death Wing, Sea Dragon and When The Wizard Awakes
Shark Bait (January 2008) — The Xanadu Connection, Shark Bait and Doomcrack
The Paradise Plot (June 2008) — The Paradise Plot and Deathmask
Polestar (November 2008) — Flittermouse, Polestar, The Scent Of Danger, Snake Goddess and Double Eagle
The Girl Machine (July 2009) — The Girl Machine, Beware of Butterflies and The Nevsky Nude
Nightbird (March 2010) — Nightbird, Hot-Shot and Ape of Diamonds

The Harpies, included in The Spy Who Loved Me, is the first non-Fleming-based Bond comic strip to be reprinted as well as the first original story. River of Death, in the Colonel Sun collection, is the second original story to be published (Colonel Sun itself being an adaptation of the first post-Fleming Bond novel). The Golden Ghost is the first collection comprising all-original stories.

The collection The Phoenix Project indicates that the July 2007 release was to have been Nightbird, but this was not published as scheduled. The Nightbird collection eventually saw print in March 2010 and is considered the final release in the Titan series as all Daily Express-related strips have now been reprinted.

Third Titan Books series
From September 2009 to November 2014 larger volumes called 'Omnibus' editions were released containing more stories in each volume.

The James Bond Omnibus: Volume 001 (September 2009) — Casino Royale, Live and Let Die, Moonraker, Diamonds Are Forever, From Russia with Love, Dr. No, Goldfinger, Risico, From a View to a Kill, For Your Eyes Only and Thunderball
The James Bond Omnibus: Volume 002 (February 2011) — On Her Majesty's Secret Service, You Only Live Twice, The Man with the Golden Gun, The Living Daylights, Octopussy, The Hildebrand Rarity and The Spy Who Loved Me
The James Bond Omnibus: Volume 003 (March 2012) — The Harpies, River of Death, Colonel Sun, The Golden Ghost, Fear Face, Double Jeopardy and Starfire
The James Bond Omnibus: Volume 004 (October 2012) — Trouble Spot, Isle of Condors, The League of Vampires, Die With My Boots On, The Girl Machine, Beware of Butterflies, The Nevsky Nude, The Phoenix Project and The Black Ruby Caper
The James Bond Omnibus: Volume 005 (November 2013) — Till Death Do Us Part, The Torch-Time Affair, Hot-Shot, Nightbird, Ape of Diamonds, When The Wizard Awakes, Sea Dragon, Death Wing and The Xanadu Connection
The James Bond Omnibus: Volume 006 (November 2014) —  Shark Bait, Doomcrack, The Paradise Plot, Deathmask,  Flittermouse, Polestar, The Scent Of Danger, Snake Goddess and Double Eagle

Fourth Titan Books series
From November 2015 a series of hardcover collections was released containing up to six stories in each volume.

James Bond – SPECTRE: The Complete Comic Strip Collection (November 2015) — Thunderball, The Spy Who Loved Me, On Her Majesty’s Secret Service and You Only Live Twice
The Complete James Bond – Dr No: The Classic Comic Strip Collection 1958-60 (November 2016) — Casino Royale, Live and Let Die, Moonraker, Diamonds Are Forever, From Russia with Love and Dr. No
The Complete James Bond – Goldfinger: The Classic Comic Strip Collection 1960-66 (March 2017) — Goldfinger, Risico, From a View to a Kill, For Your Eyes Only, The Man with the Golden Gun and The Living Daylights
The Complete James Bond – Octopussy: The Classic Comic Strip Collection 1966-69 (November 2017) — Octopussy, The Hildebrand Rarity, The Harpies, River of Death

See also

 James Bond comic books
 Outline of James Bond

Further reading
 The Rolls Royce of Comic Strips: James Bond in the Daily Express

External links
Titan Books' James Bond Graphic Novels List
James Bond comics MI6 coverage of James Bond comics strips and comic books
Just Johnny's James Bond Comics Website
When Bond Battled Dinosaurs - A Brief History of 007 Comics
I Love Comix Archive: James Bond
Archivo 007   Spanish James Bond comics

 
British comic strips
1958 comics debuts
1983 comics endings
Titan Books titles